Richard Stubbs Jemison (September 19, 1886 – January 9, 1965) was an early 20th-century American sportswriter in the South who was for eleven years the sporting editor of the Atlanta Constitution. He wrote extensively on baseball and football, picking many an All-Southern team. Supposedly, he was the first sports editor to include batting stats in his newspaper column. For two years he was president of the Georgia–Alabama League.

Dick Jemison himself was an avid golfer, basketball player, and bowler.

Early years 
Dick Jemison was born on September 19, 1886 in Macon, Georgia to Robert W. Jemison and Kate Boifeuillet. His uncle was Edwin Francis Jemison, a Confederate veteran who died at the Battle of Malvern Hill at just 17 years old. Dick's brother J. B. Jemison was later club president of the Thomasville Hornets in 1913.

Atlanta

On watching the flight of Charles K. Hamilton in 1910 he wrote, "The time is not far off when the automobile will be put in the discard for the flying machine, just like the horse was passed up for the automobile."

Sports
On Georgia's first All-American he wrote, "When you mention football to an Athens fan its definition is Bob McWhorter, and vice-versa;" and McWhorter's "value to the Red and Black team cannot be fully expressed in mere words, or even figures." In 1915, Jemison was first to report that Georgia captain-elect Charlie Thompson was ineligible.

Ohio
Jemison also contributed to Motor World. By 1917 he resigned to enter the automobile business as a salesman and publicity manager for Poole & McCullough Motor Company, which handled the Dort, Winton Six, and Locomobile in Atlanta. He was also once in charge of sales promotion at the Miller Rubber Company. In 1920, he was appointed advertising and sales promotion manager of the Oldfield Tire Co. in Akron, Ohio. He was then national advertising manager for the Ohio State Journal.

Bibliography

Notes

References

1886 births
1965 deaths
Writers from Macon, Georgia
Sportswriters from Georgia (U.S. state)
Sportswriters from Ohio